Rikdag, also called Ricdag, Riddag, or Rihdag (died 985), was Margrave of Meissen from 979 until his death. In 982, he also acquired the marches of Merseburg and Zeitz. After the Great Slav Rising in 983, he temporarily reunited all of the southern marca Geronis under his command. His march included the territory of the Chutizi and Dolomici tribes.

Life

Rikdag possibly is a progenitor of the House of Wettin, the son of Volkmar I (d. before 961), a Saxon count in the Harzgau. He is mentioned as an agnatic relative of Theodoric I of Wettin, who was raised at the Meissen court, however, the exact circumstances of their family relationship are not known.

Ricdag's daughter, Oda or Hunilda, married Boleslaus I the Brave, who later became the King of Poland. However, this marriage alliance was cut short by the interests of power politics.

Rikdag was documented as a count in the Schwabengau region of Eastphalia. In 979 he followed Margrave Thietmar in the Margraviate of Meissen and in 982 was enfeoffed with the Merseburg and Zeitz marches, succeeding both Margrave Gunther and Margrave Wigger I.

In 983, following word of the defeat of  Emperor Otto II at the Battle of Stilo against the Kalbid Emirate of Sicily, the Slavic tribes bordering eastern Saxony rebelled. The episcopal seats of Havelberg and Brandenburg were destroyed and the March of Zeitz devastated. Ricdag and Dietrich of the Nordmark joined with the troops of Gisilher, Archbishop of Magdeburg and the Bishop of Halberstadt and defeated the Slavs at Belkesheim, near Stendal. 

In 985, Ricdag and his sister, Eilsuit, founded the nunnery of Gerbstedt, in which he was buried and she was first abbess. Ricdag's and Dietrich's deaths in that same year were a severe setback on the middle border. By an unnamed wife, Ricdag, beside the aforementioned Oda, left a son and another daughter: Charles (died 28 April 1014), who was count in the Schwabengau in 992 and who was unjustly deprived of his benefices because of false accusations, and Gerburga (died 30 October 1022), who was later abbess of Quedlinburg.

References
Thompson, James Westfall. Feudal Germany, Volume II. New York: Frederick Ungar Publishing Co., 1928.

|-

|-

985 deaths
Margraves of Meissen
Year of birth unknown